Dawkinsia singhala is a species of ray-finned fish in the genus Dawkinsia. It is found in Sri Lanka.  The genus Dawkinsia is named after evolutionary biologist Richard Dawkins.

References 

Dawkinsia
Freshwater fish of Sri Lanka
Endemic fauna of Sri Lanka
Taxa named by Georg Duncker
Fish described in 1912